The pine woods snake (Rhadinaea flavilata), also commonly known as the yellow-lipped snake or the brown-headed snake, is a species of secretive colubrid found in scattered locations across the  south-eastern United States. Rhadinaea flavilata is rear-fanged and mildly-venomous, but not dangerous to humans.

Description
R. flavilata is a small reddish brown to yellowish brown or dark orange snake with a whitish to yellowish, unmarked underside. A dark stripe runs through the eye. A light stripe may be present along the middle of the back. The upper labial scales (lip scales) are a whitish or pale yellow color which led to its other common name, the yellow-lipped snake.

Pine woods snakes average between 10 and 13 inches (25–33 cm) in total length (including tail) at adult size.

Natural habitat
R. flavilata is found in scattered localities in coastal North Carolina and South Carolina, most of peninsular Florida, and small portions of Georgia, Alabama, and Louisiana. The pine snake inhabits pine and mixed-pine hardwood forests. They can be found in damp woodlands, under bark and in rotten logs and stumps. The species has a scattered geographic distribution with large expanses occurring between known populations.

Behavior and diet
Because many R. flavilata are found in warm coastal areas, they are active for most of the year. They will hibernate underground  or in logs in cold winter conditions. There is little information about the diet of the R. flavilata. Captive species prey on small frogs, salamanders and small lizards.

Reproduction
Pine woods snakes lay eggs. There is little know information about reproduction. Mating probably occurs in the spring and one to four eggs are laid during the summer months. Some females lay two clutches of eggs each year. The incubation period is six to eight weeks.

Predators
Natural predators of the R. flavilata include the Southern black racer and the Kingsnake, as well as carnivorous pine forest animals. Shrews, birds and toads are likely predators. Pine woods snakes do not bite when picked up but they can release a foul-smelling odor.

References

Further reading
Conant R, Bridges W. 1939. What Snake is That?: A Field Guide to the Snakes of the United States East of the Rocky Mountains. (with 108 drawings by Edmond Malnate). New York and London: D. Appleton-Century. Frontispiece map + 163 pp. + Plates A-C, 1-32. (Rhadinaea flavilata, p. 70 + Plate C, Figure 11).
Cope ED. 1871. Ninth Contribution to the Herpetology of Tropical America. Proc. Acad. Nat. Sci. Philadelphia 23 (2): 200-224. (Dromicus flavilatus, new species, pp. 222–223).
Malnate E. 1939. A Study of the Yellow-Lipped Snake, Rhadinaea flavilata (Cope). Zoologica 24: 359-366 + one plate.
Zim HS, Smith HM. 1956. Reptiles and Amphibians: A Guide to Familiar American Species: A Golden Nature Guide. New York: Simon and Schuster.160 pp. (Rhadinaea flavilata, pp. 83–84, 156).

External links
Reptile Database
Snakes of Georgia and South Carolina

Colubrids
Reptiles described in 1871
Fauna of the Southeastern United States
Reptiles of the United States